The 1963 Walker Cup, the 19th Walker Cup Match, was played on 24 and 25 May 1963, at Turnberry, Ayrshire, Scotland. The event was won by the United States 12 to 8 with 4 matches halved. This was the first Walker Cup in which 18-hole matches were played.

Great Britain and Ireland took a 6 to 3 lead on the first day after Billy Joe Patton was the only singles winner for the United States. However, the United States won all four foursomes matches on the second morning and five of the singles  in the afternoon.

Format
The format for play on Friday and Saturday was the same. There were four matches of foursomes in the morning and eight singles matches in the afternoon. In all, 24 matches were played.

Each of the 24 matches was worth one point in the larger team competition. If a match was all square after the 18th hole extra holes were not played. The team with most points won the competition. If the two teams were tied, the previous winner would retain the trophy.

Teams
Ten players for the United States and Great Britain & Ireland participated in the event plus one non-playing captain for each team.

Great Britain & Ireland
 & 
Captain:  Charles Lawrie
 Michael Bonallack
 Joe Carr
 Martin Christmas
 Charlie Green
 Michael Lunt
 David Madeley
 Stuart Murray
 Sandy Saddler
 Ronnie Shade
 David Sheahan

United States

Captain: Richard Tufts
Deane Beman
Charles Coe
Richard Davies
Robert W. Gardner
Downing Gray
Labron Harris Jr.
Billy Joe Patton
R. H. Sikes
Charlie Smith
Ed Updegraff

Friday's matches

Morning foursomes

Afternoon singles

Saturday's matches

Morning foursomes

Afternoon singles

References

Walker Cup
Golf tournaments in Scotland
Walker Cup
Walker Cup
Walker Cup